Clacton is a constituency in Essex represented in the House of Commons of the UK Parliament. It contains the seaside towns of Clacton-on-Sea, Frinton-on-Sea and Walton-on-the-Naze. Clacton has been represented since 2017 by Giles Watling of the Conservative Party.

The seat was created in 2010; Douglas Carswell, who was previously the Conservative MP for Harwich, won it at the general election that year. In 2014, Carswell announced his defection to the UK Independence Party (UKIP); this triggered a by-election in the constituency, which Carswell won with a large majority, becoming UKIP's first elected MP. Carswell retained his seat at the 2015 general election; this was the only constituency won by UKIP at the election. In March 2017, Carswell left UKIP and became an independent MP; he did not stand for re-election in the 2017 general election, and the seat was gained by Watling for the Conservatives.

History 
The seat was created for the 2010 general election following a review of the Parliamentary representation of Essex by the Boundary Commission for England.  It was formed from the abolished Harwich constituency, excluding the town of Harwich itself and surrounding areas.

Boundaries

The District of Tendring wards of Alton Park, Beaumont and Thorpe, Bockings Elm, Burrsville, Frinton, Golf Green, Hamford, Haven, Holland and Kirby, Homelands, Little Clacton and Weeley, Pier, Rush Green, St Bartholomews, St James, St Johns, St Marys, St Osyth and Point Clear, St Pauls and Walton.

The new seat consists essentially of the former Harwich constituency, minus the town of Harwich itself and a few nearby villages, plus St Osyth and Weeley, transferred from the old North Essex constituency.  Apart from the North Sea it is surrounded by the Harwich and North Essex constituency on all other sides. It contains the towns of Clacton-on-Sea, Frinton-on-Sea and Walton-on-the-Naze, as well as surrounding villages.

Constituency profile
The new seat is almost completely coastal, comprising seaside resorts along the Tendring peninsula. It shares an inland border with just one constituency – Harwich and North Essex.

Like some other coastal seats, such as Christchurch in Dorset, the electorate is one of the oldest in the country, with a high proportion of retired people, and low numbers of non-White residents. The area has experienced a considerable influx of White British families from multicultural areas of East London such as Barking and Dagenham, leading to the town of Clacton becoming known as "Little Dagenham."

The village of Jaywick was, in both the Indices of deprivation 2010 and 2015, identified as the single most deprived LSOA in England, out of around 32,000, with unemployment estimated at almost 50%. Many homes are essentially beach huts and lack basic amenities. In the 2007 Index, this area was the third-most deprived in the country.

Members of Parliament

The constituency's Member of Parliament until 3 May 2017, was Douglas Carswell, who had previously sat for the Harwich constituency since gaining that seat for the Conservatives in 2005.

On 28 August 2014, Carswell announced his defection to UKIP. Although not required to seek re-election following a change of party allegiance, Carswell triggered a by-election, held on 9 October 2014, in which he was elected as the UKIP candidate. He became the first elected UKIP MP. Carswell retained the seat for UKIP at the 2015 general election, seeing his majority cut by roughly three-quarters, with an 11% swing to the Conservatives. Carswell then became UKIP's sole MP in the House of Commons, as Mark Reckless, a fellow Conservative defector, lost his seat.

On 25 March 2017, Carswell announced on his blog that he was quitting UKIP to sit as an independent MP, saying that "I switched to UKIP because I desperately wanted us to leave the EU. Now we can be certain that that is going to happen, I have decided that I will be leaving UKIP".

After Prime Minister Theresa May called a snap election on 19 April 2017, Carswell announced that he would not stand for re-election, and he endorsed the Conservative Party candidate Giles Watling. Watling was elected at the 2017 general election; at that election, UKIP's share of the vote fell by 36.8%, one of its largest declines in the country, and the subsequent Conservative victory in Clacton marked the first time every constituency in Essex had returned a Conservative MP since 1987.

Elections

See also
 List of parliamentary constituencies in Essex

Notes

References

External links
nomis Constituency Profile for Clacton – presenting data from the ONS annual population survey and other official statistics.

Clacton-on-Sea
Parliamentary constituencies in Essex
Tendring
Constituencies of the Parliament of the United Kingdom established in 2010